Louis Ferdinand Elle the Elder, dit Louis Le Vieux (1612 –1689) was a French portrait painter who was the son of Ferdinand Elle.

Biography
Elle was born and died in Paris.  According to the RKD he was one of the 12 men who were dissatisfied with the Paris Guild of St. Luke and who founded the Académie de peinture et de sculpture in 1648. His portraits were influenced by Anthony van Dyck and Charles Errard, among others. He became the teacher of his son, Louis Ferdinand Elle the Younger.

Works

References

Louis Ferdinand Elle the Elder on Artnet

1612 births
1689 deaths
17th-century French painters
French male painters
Painters from Paris